Runaway Mine Train (and variants) may refer to:

Mine Train roller coaster, a type of steel roller coaster whose trains depict a set of mine carts, including:
Runaway Mine Train (Alton Towers), Staffordshire, England
Runaway Mine Train (Six Flags Great Adventure), roller coaster located in Jackson, New Jersey, United States
Runaway Mine Train (Six Flags Over Texas), roller coaster located in Arlington, Texas, United States
River King Mine Train, known at one time as the River King Run-Away Mine Train, Six Flags St. Louis, Missouri, United States

See also
 Runaway Train (disambiguation)